Sancho I may refer to:

 Sancho I of Gascony (died 812), Basque Duke
 Sancho I of Pamplona (circa 860–925), Navarrese monarch
 Sancho I Ordóñez (circa 895–929), King of Galicia
 Sancho I of León (died 966), two-time King of León
 Sancho I of Aragon (c. 1042 – 4 June 1094), second king of Aragon
 Sancho I of Astarac (fl. 1050–1096/1119), count of Astarac
 Sancho I of Portugal (1154–1212), King of Portugal